The 1956 Perth Carnival was the 13th edition of the Australian National Football Carnival, an Australian football interstate competition. It took place from 11 to 23 June at Subiaco Oval, Perth.

Five teams automatically qualified for the carnival as a result of their finishing positions at the 1953 Adelaide Carnival: two Victorian teams Victoria (VFL) and Victoria (VFA), the hosts Western Australia, South Australia &. Tasmania, which had finished last at the 1953 Carnival, qualified only after defeating the winners of the lower division, the Australian Amateurs, in a playoff at North Hobart Oval on 10 July 1954, by the score of 16.21 (117) to 9.10 (64).

Victoria finished the fortnight unbeaten while Tasmania equaled their best performance ever by finishing third.

Results

All-Australian team
In 1956 the All-Australian team was picked based on the performances at the Perth Carnival.

Tassie Medal
Ruckman Graham Farmer won the Tassie Medal, making it four wins out of five in carnivals for Western Australian players.

Goalkicking

References

1956 Perth Carnival page on Full Points Footy

Australian rules interstate football
Perth Carnival, 1956